The 1906 Colgate football team was an American football team that represented Colgate University as an independent during the 1906 college football season. In its first season under head coach Bill Warner, the team compiled a 4–2–2 record. Ralph Knapp was the team captain. The team played its home games on Whitnall Field in Hamilton, New York.

Schedule

References

Colgate
Colgate Raiders football seasons
Colgate football